Felipe Manguiat Medalla is a Filipino economist currently serving as the Governor of the Bangko Sentral ng Pilipinas, central monetary authority of the Philippines, and the ex officio chairman of the Anti-Money Laundering Council, the central anti-money laundering/counter-terrorism financing authority of the Philippines under the Marcos administration since 2022. He previously served as the 9th Socio-Economic Planning Secretary and Director-General of the National Economic and Development Authority under President Joseph Estrada.

Medalla served as dean of the University of the Philippines School of Economics. In 1983, he earned his Ph.D. in economics from Northwestern University in Evanston, Illinois. His dissertation "Industrial Location in the Philippines" showed the consistence of a combination of Weberian and Loschian ideas in the location of industries in the Philppines.

References

Sources
 Angara Center for Law and Economics: Profile of Dr. Felipe Medalla

|-

20th-century Filipino economists
Living people
Directors-General of the National Economic and Development Authority of the Philippines
Governors of the Bangko Sentral ng Pilipinas
Bongbong Marcos administration personnel
Estrada administration cabinet members
De La Salle University alumni
Northwestern University alumni
University of the Philippines alumni
Academic staff of the University of the Philippines
Year of birth missing (living people)
21st-century Filipino economists